Mario & Luigi: Superstar Saga is a role-playing video game developed by AlphaDream and published by Nintendo for the Game Boy Advance in 2003. It was re-released for the Wii U's Virtual Console in 2014, Nintendo Switch Online Service in 2023, and remade for the Nintendo 3DS as Mario & Luigi: Superstar Saga + Bowser's Minions in 2017. In the game, Mario and Luigi travel to the Beanbean Kingdom in order to combat Cackletta and Fawful, who stole Princess Peach's voice for the purpose of harnessing the power of a special artifact called the Beanstar.

This game is the third role-playing game in the Mario franchise after Super Mario RPG and Paper Mario. Unlike those titles however, Superstar Saga features a lighthearted whimsical script and a greater emphasis on comedy and humor. The player controls Mario and Luigi simultaneously as they traverse the overworld, fight enemies, gain experience points, and find new items and gear. The battle system differs from traditional games of the genre, with more emphasis on timing and elaborate attacks called Action Commands. Created by Shigeru Miyamoto, Tetsuo Mizuno, and Satoru Iwata, the game was announced at E3 2003, later releasing the same year.

Superstar Saga was critically acclaimed, with reviewers praising the game's writing and tone and criticism and mixed opinions on the gameplay and the top-down perspective respectively. Critics listed the game among the best games on the Game Boy Advance, and was labeled as Player's Choice. A Nintendo 3DS remake was released in 2017 and features updated graphics and music, amiibo functionality, and other quality-of-life improvements. It also features a new exclusive side story titled Minion Quest: The Search for Bowser. The original game was released as part of the Nintendo Switch Online + Expansion Pack in February 2023.

Gameplay 

The gameplay of Mario & Luigi differs from most other role-playing games due to its focus on controlling Mario and Luigi simultaneously. During overworld sections, the directional pad controls one of the brothers' movement with the other one following closely. The leading brother can be switched between Mario and Luigi with the Start button. The brothers' other actions are controlled individually with the A (front character) and B (rear character) buttons respectively. The game begins with them being able to jump independently, and they gain access to hammers and a variety of other techniques as the game progresses. For example, Luigi's hammer can be used to squash Mario into a smaller size, allowing the latter to access small gaps, while placing Mario on Luigi's shoulders allows them to act like a propeller and hover across large gaps. Various enemies roam the overworld, and coming into contact with these enemies initiates a battle. Landing a hit on an enemy while on the overworld allows the player to deal pre-emptive damage or begin the fight with them stunned. The opposite is also possible.

Battles in Superstar Saga are turn-based. Mario and Luigi are controlled with the A and B buttons respectively, regardless of their placement in the overworld. They can attack normally by jumping on enemies (available from the start), by hitting them with their hammers or by using their hand powers (after these abilities are unlocked at successive points in the game's story). Jump attacks allow the brothers to hit enemies from above, but will cause them to take damage if attempting to jump on spiked or flame-covered creatures. Hammer attacks can harm enemies on the ground, but will always miss against winged or floating ones. Finally, each brother has an elemental hand attack (fire for Mario and thunder for Luigi), with several enemies being either vulnerable or resistant to either element.

Similar to previous Mario role-playing titles, such as Super Mario RPG and the Paper Mario series, players can time button presses to make their attacks more effective, such as earning an extra jump attack or increasing the hammer's power. Introduced in this series is the way in which Mario and Luigi can defend themselves during an enemy's attack. When an enemy attacks, the brothers can either jump or use their hammer which, when successfully timed, allows them to dodge their attacks and even deal counter damage (for example: if they jump on top of a charging Goomba).

Throughout the game, players can unlock Bros. Attacks, which use Bros. Points (BP) which requires players to cooperate between Mario and Luigi's actions to perform powerful combination attacks. Players can also use items such as mushrooms for healing, peppers for boosting stats and 1UP mushrooms for reviving fallen Bros.

Defeating enemies earns experience points which help the Bros. level up and increase their stats, with players given the option to further increase the stats of one attribute every time they level up. Players can further improve their stats by equipping new gear to the Bros. or making them wear badges that give them special attributes.

Like other Mario titles for the Game Boy Advance, Superstar Saga features the enhanced remake of the Mario Bros. arcade game, which was used in the four Super Mario Advance titles. The game also supports rumble functionality when used with the GameCube's Game Boy Player accessory.

Plot
Mario & Luigi: Superstar Saga is largely set in the Beanbean Kingdom, a country neighboring the Mario series' usual setting of the Mushroom Kingdom, mainly populated by Beanish people and Hoohooligans. The player characters are brothers Mario and Luigi, who travel to the Beanbean Kingdom to return the voice of Peach, the princess of the Mushroom Kingdom, after it is stolen by the Beanish witch Cackletta and her henchman Fawful. Among other characters are Queen Bean and Prince Peasley of the Beanbean Kingdom, who assist Mario and Luigi; and the thief Popple, who crosses paths with them throughout the game.

Superstar Saga 
The game opens with Cackletta and Fawful, disguised as ambassadors of the Beanbean Kingdom, visiting Princess Peach's castle in the Mushroom Kingdom to steal her voice, replacing it with explosives that drop from her speech balloon when she talks. Mario and Luigi are summoned to the castle, and meet Bowser, who had intended to kidnap Peach, but decides against it due to her explosive speech. The three team up to retrieve Peach's voice, and fly to the Beanbean Kingdom on Bowser's airship. Mid-flight, Fawful attacks them, and Bowser becomes separated from Mario and Luigi after a crash landing on the Mushroom Kingdom side of the Beanbean Kingdom border. After crossing the border and traveling through the Beanbean Kingdom by foot, Mario and Luigi meet Peasley and save him from a spell cast by Cackletta.

They get invited to the Beanbean Kingdom castle, where Cackletta – disguised as the royal advisor Lady Lima – tricks them into helping her steal the Beanstar, a mystical item that when awoken by a noble and beautiful voice will grant any wish. Trailing Cackletta to Woohoo Hooniversity, they find her exposing the Beanstar to the stolen voice, causing it to go berserk. Mario and Luigi battle Cackletta, fatally injuring her; Fawful uses his vacuum-equipped helmet to retrieve her soul to save her. Mario and Luigi locate the Beanstar again, which Popple is trying to steal together with an amnesiac Bowser; when it again is exposed to Peach's voice, it shoots into the sky and explodes, scattering across the kingdom. Peach arrives in the Beanbean Kingdom, and Mario and Luigi learn that Birdo had been used as a political decoy during Cackletta's visit; it was because Birdo's voice was the one that had been stolen that the Beanstar went berserk.

Fawful finds Bowser, weakened from the Beanstar's explosion, and places Cackletta's soul inside him; she takes control of the body, and takes the name Bowletta. She kidnaps Peach, and demands the Beanstar as ransom; Mario and Luigi collect the pieces, and meet with her to make the exchange. Bowletta refuses to return Peach, so Luigi disguises himself as Peach to be taken in her stead, and manages to reclaim the Beanstar, after which Bowletta uses Bowser's flying castle to attack the Beanbean Kingdom. Mario and Luigi enter the castle, and exorcise her soul from Bowser's body. Peasley blows up the flying castle, and Mario, Luigi, Peach, and Bowser return to the Mushroom Kingdom.

Development and marketing 
Superstar Saga, developed by AlphaDream, is said to take its inspiration from the Nintendo 64 game Paper Mario; the two games have similar graphics and gameplay. The producers of the game were Shigeru Miyamoto, the creator of the Mario franchise, Tetsuo Mizuno, and Satoru Iwata, the president of Nintendo. The voice acting for Mario and Luigi in the game is provided by Charles Martinet, well known for providing the characters' voice in Nintendo's Mario franchise. The game's music was composed by Yoko Shimomura, who also previously composed the soundtrack for Super Mario RPG.

Superstar Saga was revealed at E3 2003 under the name Mario and Luigi, where a playable demo of the game was available. In August and September 2003, a playable demonstration was also available at the European Computer Trade Show, the Games Convention, and Nintendo Gamers' Summit. To link in with the game's comedic themes, Nintendo organized an official competition between October and November 2003 in which contestants would try to submit the best knock-knock joke to win a Game Boy Advance SP and a copy of the game. Nintendo employed comedian Kathy Griffin to choose the winner.

Reception 

Superstar Saga received "universal acclaim", according to the review aggregator Metacritic. The game's comical dialog and themes in particular were lauded by critics. Eurogamer's Tom Bramwell commented that "each line of dialogue and identifiable cameo is handled with a loving sense of humour." Despite this, RPGamer's Andrew Long labelled the plot as repetitive, and the game's characters as "a tad shallow". While also appreciating references to the heritage of the Mario series, critics praised the game for avoiding clichés common in previous games of the Mario series.

The gameplay attained a mixed reception. Critics enjoyed the game's battle system, which deviated from role-playing game tradition. IGN's Craig Harris commented that "unlike most Japanese RPGs Mario & Luigi's turn-based battle involves the player at all times". Despite this novel approach to combat situations, some reviewers thought that the overall gameplay lacked innovation. GameSpy in particular criticized the game for an apparent lack of originality, commenting that "in terms of gameplay, there isn't much there that we haven't seen in the NES and SNES Mario and Zelda titles." Furthermore, some reviewers were disappointed by a perceived lack of difficulty in the gameplay as a result of targeting a younger audience. Edge and other gaming publications have criticized the controls for being occasionally confusing when considering the usage of jumping, hammers, and other combinations between the two characters.

A common concern among reviewers is the overhead perspective, which critics have bemoaned for preventing them from judging pathway routes and an object's location in relation to its background. Besides this, the actual visuals were generally well received, as well as the setting and animations. The audio was commended for combining both originality and nostalgia, even though it looped frequently.

GameSpot named Superstar Saga the best Game Boy Advance game of November 2003. In 2006, Superstar Saga was rated the 37th best game made on a Nintendo System in Nintendo Powers Top 200 Games list. In the same year, the game became part of the Player's Choice label. In 2007, the game was named the twelfth best Game Boy Advance game of all time in IGN's feature reflecting on the Game Boy Advance's long lifespan. In the United States alone, Superstar Saga sold 1,000,000 copies and earned $30,000,000 by August 2006. During the period between January 2000 and August 2006, it was the 14th highest-selling game launched for the Game Boy Advance, Nintendo DS or PlayStation Portable in that country. As of 2007, Superstar Saga has sold over 441,000 units in Japan and 1,460,000 in the United States.

Remake 

A remake of Superstar Saga for Nintendo 3DS, Mario & Luigi: Superstar Saga + Bowser's Minions, was announced at E3 2017. The remake features updated graphics, maintaining the use of sprites, but with additional lighting effects akin to Dream Team and Paper Jam, as well as a remastered soundtrack and various quality-of-life improvements that were introduced in later entries of the series, such as the ability to save the game at any time, and to fast-forward cutscenes, among others.  The game also features Amiibo functionality, tied to the existing Boo and new Goomba and Koopa Troopa figures. The game was released in October 2017.

Plot
The remake also adds an additional storyline, Minion Quest: The Search for Bowser, which follows Captain Goomba and features a real-time strategy battle system.

Minion Quest: The Search for Bowser
In the Bowser's airship travelling to Beanbean Kingdom, two Goombas, Captain Goomba and Private Goomp, trapped inside barrels ally to give the Goombas their deserved reputation by ceasing slavery by the Koopalings. However, Bowser's airship crashes by Fawful. Captain Goomba awakens on Hoohoo Mountain and decides to rescue Bowser after witnessing him being shot in a cannon. Captain Goomba create an army and start his search.

Upon learning that some of the minions -- including Private Goomp -- were brainwashed by Fawful trying to rescue Bowser and that his mission is competition with the Koopalings, Captain Goomba confronts Fawful only to fall off the mountain. Realizing Fawful is powerful, Captain Goomba ally once more with Private Goomp and form a varied army; the army travels across all the kingdom to recruit everyone. Meanwhile, the Koopalings get brainwashed by Fawful. Saving Larry, the latter joins them in the condition of finding the six others Koopalings.

With Larry and Wendy on their side, the Minion's Army arrives back at Hoohoo Mountain, witnessing an amnesiac Bowser being saved as "Rookie" by Popple. The Minions pursue Popple -- saving Morton in the process -- to only find he has lost Bowser; the latter having been transformed into Bowletta. The army finds Roy and Bowser's airship. Upon repairing it, they learn from Fawful that Bowletta is in Bowser's Castle. The Minions fly there and recruit the remaining Koopalings, gaining their respects the Goombas always wanted. 

Bowser's army fully complete, the Minions confronts Fawful and his "Mecha" army; victorious, Fawful flees to join Bowletta but both are defeat by the Mario Bros in the meantime. Bowser's Castle explodes, and Bowser, back to normal, returns to the Mushroom Kingdom with the army. Bowser promotes Captain Goomba only to remember the latter was the cause of his amnesia, and starts to pursue him instead.

Notes

References

External links
 Official European website

2003 video games
AlphaDream games
Game Boy Advance games
Mario role-playing games
Multiplayer and single-player video games
Nintendo Switch Online games
Video games developed in Japan
Video games scored by Yoko Shimomura
Virtual Console games
Virtual Console games for Wii U
Single-player video games
Mario & Luigi
Video games that use Amiibo figurines